The all-time medal table  for all Olympic Games from 1896 to 2022, including Summer Olympic Games, Winter Olympic Games, and a combined total of both, is tabulated below. These Olympic medal counts do not include the 1906 Intercalated Games which are no longer recognized by the International Olympic Committee (IOC) as official Games.
The IOC itself does not publish all-time tables, and publishes unofficial tables only per single Games. This table was thus compiled by adding up single entries from the IOC database.

The results are attributed to the IOC country code as currently displayed by the IOC database. Usually, a single code corresponds to a single National Olympic Committee (NOC). When different codes are displayed for different years, medal counts are combined in the case of a simple change of IOC code (such as from HOL to NED for the Netherlands) or simple change of country name (such as from Ceylon to Sri Lanka). As the medals are attributed to each NOC, not all totals include medals won by athletes from that country for another NOC, such as before independence of that country. Names in italic are national entities that no longer exist. The totals of NOCs are not combined with those of their predecessors and successors.

List of NOCs with medals (sortable & unranked)

The table is pre-sorted by the name of each Olympic Committee, but can be displayed as sorted by any other column, such as the total number of gold medals or total number of overall medals. To sort by gold, silver, and then bronze, sort first by the bronze column, then the silver, and then the gold. The table does not count revoked medals (e.g., due to doping).

A total of 156 current and historical NOCs have earned at least one medal. Medal totals in this table are current through the 2022 Winter Olympics in Beijing, People's Republic of China, and all changes in medal standings due to doping cases and medal redistributions up to 20 February 2022 are taken into account.

The sum total of gold, silver, and bronze medals are not equal for the following reasons:
 Some sports (such as boxing, judo, taekwondo, and wrestling) award or have previously awarded two bronze medals per competition.
 Team sports medals, such as in football or basketball count as one, even if there are multiple players on each team, who get a medal.
 Some tied performances have resulted in multiple medals of the same colour being awarded for an event. If this tie is for gold or silver, there will be a consequent absence of a silver or bronze medal for that event.
 Some medals that have been revoked have not been re-awarded.
 Some early events, such as cricket at the 1900 Summer Olympics, had only two entrants.
 Retroactively awarding gold, silver, and bronze medals for the 1896 and 1900 games results in some anomalies, such as the 100 metre freestyle swimming event in 1896 where no surviving records distinguish the places of those who finished between 3rd and 10th position.

List of NOCs without medals (sortable & unranked)
After the 2022 Winter Olympics in Beijing, 68 of the current 206 National Olympic Committees have yet to win an Olympic medal. Seven historic National Olympic Committees and the Refugee Olympic Team are also included in this list.

List of defunct historical NOCs and special delegations with medals (sortable & unranked)

Defunct historical NOCs with medals 

A total of 10 defunct historical NOCs have earned at least one medal.

Special delegations with medals 

A total of 8 special delegations have earned at least one medal. Medal totals in this table are current through the 2022 Winter Olympics in Beijing, People's Republic of China, and all changes in medal standings due to doping cases and medal redistributions up to 20 February are taken into account.

Top ten medal rankings (combined NOCs)
The following is the overall medal tally (top ten nations) with the records of current NOCs combined with those of their precursors (sorted by gold, then silver, then bronze), through 2022.

Summer Olympics (including precursors)
Current NOCs combined with records of precursor NOCs:

Summer Olympics (excluding precursors)
Separate current and precursor NOCs (records not combined):

Winter Olympics (including precursors)
Current NOCs combined with records of precursor NOCs:

Winter Olympics (excluding precursors)
Separate current and precursor NOCs (records not combined):

Total, all Olympics (including precursors)
Current NOCs combined with records of precursor NOCs:

Total, all Olympics (excluding precursors)
Separate current and precursor NOCs (records not combined):

Complete ranked medals (excluding precursors)

Summer Olympics (1896–2020)

Winter Olympics (1924–2022)

Combined total (1896–2022)

Medal leaders by year

Summer

Number of occurrences

Winter

Number of occurrences

Special Case of Germany
If results for East and West Germany are combined, German athletes also won the most gold medals in the 1976 Summer Olympics and the 1988 Winter Olympics.

Variations

Early Olympics
For the 1900 Summer Olympics several countries are credited with appearances that are not considered official by the IOC. Only one of these cases concerns a medal. A gold medal that is officially added to France's total is given to Luxembourg.

Other differences from the official table are based on disagreements about which events were Olympic. This affects several of the events in the 1900 and 1904 Olympics. In addition, some sources include the 1906 Intercalated Games when compiling their medal tables.

Alpinism and aeronautics
From 1924 through 1936, the IOC on several occasions awarded gold medals for feats of alpinism and aeronautics that occurred in the preceding four-year Olympiad. In 1924, 1932 and 1936, gold medals were awarded to 25 mountaineers from six nations for expeditions in the Himalayas and the Matterhorn. In 1936, a gold medal was awarded to Hermann Schreiber of Switzerland for crossing the Alps in a glider in 1935, the first time that had been done. Some sources include these IOC awards of gold medals in the overall count.

Australasia
Australasia was a combined team of athletes from Australia and the Dominion of New Zealand that competed together at the 1908 and 1912 Summer Olympics.  When the Olympic Games resumed in 1920 after World War I, the two nations sent separate teams to the Games, and have done so ever since.

Medal counts:
status after the 2022 Winter Olympics

British West Indies
The West Indies Federation, also known as the West Indies, the Federation of the West Indies or the West Indian Federation,  was a short-lived political union that existed from 3 January 1958 to 31 May 1962. Various islands in the Caribbean that were part of the British Empire, including Trinidad and Tobago, Barbados, Jamaica, and those on the Leeward and Windward Islands, came together to form the Federation.The expressed intention of the Federation was to create a political unit that would become independent from Britain as a single state
Before that could happen, the Federation collapsed due to internal political conflicts over how it would be governed or function viably.

Athletes from the West Indies Federation competed under the name Antilles (ANT), 
renamed to British West Indies (BWI) by the IOC,  at the 1960 Summer Olympics in Rome, Italy. Thirteen competitors—two from Barbados, four from Trinidad, and seven from Jamaica—all men, took part in thirteen events in five sports. The short-lived nation only participated at these single Games, as Jamaica and Trinidad and Tobago competed independently again in 1964, and Barbados started competing at the 1968 Games.

Medal counts:
status after the 2022 Winter Olympics

Czechoslovakia
Czechoslovakia first participated at the Olympic Games in 1920, after having competed as Bohemia from 1900 to 1912. The nation sent athletes to compete in every Summer Olympic Games since then, except for the 1984 Games when they were part of the Soviet-led boycott of the 1984 Summer Olympics.Czechoslovakia has participated in every Winter Olympic Games since the inaugural Games of 1924.

After the dissolution of Czechoslovakia in 1993, the Czech Republic and Slovakia sent independent teams to the Olympics starting in 1994.

Medal counts:
status after the 2022 Olympics

Germany
Germany has competed under five different designations, including as two separate teams at several Games. Sources vary in how they present the medals won by these teams. The table below shows sourced combinations of these teams, when applied to the updated medal totals from the main table. A part of Germany, Saar, competed independently in the Summer Olympic games in 1952, but failed to win any medals. Due to most lists only listing medal counts, it's possible but not certain Saar was included as part of Germany in their calculations. Germany was denied participation on three occasions (1920, 1924, and 1948).

Medal counts:
status after the 2022 Olympics

Kuwait
At the 2016 Summer Olympics nine athletes from Kuwait competed as Independent Olympic Athletes (IOA), as the Kuwait Olympic Committee had been suspended by the International Olympic Committee (IOC) for the second time in five years due to governmental interference.
Although not allowed to compete as a sovereign state at the 2016 Summer Olympics, the nation's participants were able to compete as Independent Olympic Athletes under the Olympic flag. At those games, Kuwaiti shooters Fehaid Al-Deehani and Abdullah Al-Rashidi 
won a gold medal and bronze medal respectively as independent athletes.

Medal counts:
status after the 2022 Olympics

Netherlands Antilles
The Netherlands Antilles participated at the Olympic Games from 1952 until 2008 as a constituent country of the Kingdom of the Netherlands.
The National Olympic Committee for the Netherlands Antilles was created in 1931 and recognized by the International Olympic Committee from 1950 until 2011 upon the dissolution of the Netherlands Antilles. 

Aruba left the Netherlands Antilles in 1986 to become a constituent country within the Kingdom of the Netherlands. Between 1952 until 1984, Aruban athletes competed as part of the Netherlands Antilles. Since the Olympic Games in 1988, athletes from Aruba have competed separately under their own Olympic banner and have participated in each Summer Olympic Games since then.
 
After the dissolution of the Netherlands Antilles in 2010, Bonaire, Sint Eustatius and Saba became part of the Netherlands as special municipalities of the Netherlands. Curaçao and Sint Maarten became separate constituent countries of the Kingdom of the Netherlands. 
At the 2012 Olympics, participants from the five islands competed as independent athletes under the Olympic flag.
However, athletes from the former Netherlands Antilles who qualified for the 2012 Olympics were allowed to participate independently under the Olympic flag, in addition to the possibility of competing for the Netherlands (as for example Churandy Martina did) or Aruba (because they have Dutch nationality). Ultimately, three athletes from the Netherlands Antilles participated as Independent Olympic Athletes.

Medal counts:
status after the 2022 Olympics

Republic of China
The Republic of China (ROC) participated in its first Summer Olympics in 1932 under the name of China. After the Chinese Civil War, the ROC retreated to the island of Taiwan in 1949, and only Taiwan-based athletes have competed on its behalf since then. In 1971, the ROC was expelled from the United Nations, but was permitted to compete under its official name, flag, and anthem in the 1972 Winter, 1972 Summer, and 1976 Winter Olympics. It was denied official representation in the 1976 Summer Olympics and boycotted it as a result. The 1979 Nagoya Resolution allowed the ROC to compete under the deliberately-ambiguous name "Chinese Taipei"; it protested against this decision and boycotted the 1980 Summer Olympics as well, but has competed under this name since the 1984 Winter Olympics.

The Republic of China took part in the Opening Ceremony of the 1924 Summer Olympics, but its four athletes, all of whom were tennis players, withdrew from competition.

Medal counts:
status after the 2022 Olympics

Russia and the Soviet Union
The Russian Federation, the Russian Empire, the Olympic Athletes from Russia and the Russian Olympic Committee (ROC) are sometimes combined outside of IOC sources. The Soviet Union is often combined with the post-union team that competed in 1992. Some sources combine the Soviet Union and Russia, despite the fact that many republics which subsequently gained or re-gained independence (Armenia, Azerbaijan, Belarus, Estonia, Georgia,  Kazakhstan, Kyrgyzstan, Latvia, Lithuania, Moldova, Tajikistan, Turkmenistan, Ukraine and Uzbekistan) contributed to the medal tally of the USSR, and there are sources that combine all medals of RU1, URS, EUN, OAR, ROC and RUS. On 31 January 1992, the United Nations recognized, without objection, Russia as legal successor of the rights and obligations of the former Soviet Union, but this has no significance in medal tallies.

Medal counts:
Russia combined with precursors
status after the 2022 Olympics

Medal counts:
Post-Soviet states (except Russia)
status after the 2022 Olympics

Yugoslavia
Teams from Yugoslavia first participated at the Olympic Games in 1920. Yugoslavia has been the designation for Olympic teams from three distinct national entities:
 Kingdom of Yugoslavia (officially called the Kingdom of Serbs, Croats and Slovenes until 1929) from 1920–1936
 Socialist Federal Republic of Yugoslavia from 1948 to the 1992 Winter Olympics
 Federal Republic of Yugoslavia, formed as a joint state by only Montenegro and Serbia after the breakup of Yugoslavia, from 1996 to 2002

The United Nations affirmed that the Socialist Federal Republic of Yugoslavia had ceased to exist, and the Federal Republic of Yugoslavia (FRY) was a new state. All former republics were entitled to state succession, while none of them continued SFR Yugoslavia's international legal personality. As a result of the U.N. resolution, individual FRY athletes were allowed to compete as Independent Olympic Participants at the 1992 Summer Olympics, and FRY was not allowed to compete at the 1994 Winter Olympics.

The Federal Republic of Yugoslavia, consisting of the Republic of Serbia and the Republic of Montenegro, participated at the Games since 1996. At the 1996 and 2000 Games, the nation was designated with the same code, Yugoslavia (YUG), as the defunct SFRY. It was rechartered as the State Union of Serbia and Montenegro in 2003 with there being no territorial changes. The Serbia and Montenegro (SCG) designation and code were used at the 2004 Games.

Two of the successor nations (Croatia and Slovenia) began to compete as independent teams at the Olympics starting at the 1992 Winter Games and Bosnia and Herzegovina at the 1992 Summer Games and as of the 2008 Summer Olympics, all six successor nations, former socialist republics, have participated independently. Kosovo, a former autonomous province, made its Olympic debut as an independent national team at the 2016 Summer Olympics.

Medal counts:
status after the 2022 Olympics

Others
In addition to the teams of Independent Olympians at the Olympic Games mentioned above—Kuwait, Russia, the former Netherlands Antilles, and the former Yugoslavia—several other NOCs were represented by independent Olympic athletes. East Timor's team in 2000 consisted of four athletes competing as Individual Olympic Athletes. In 2012, one independent Olympic athlete represented South Sudan. In the 2014 Winter Olympics, the team from India included one independent Olympic participant.

Notes

Obsolete nations notes

  → ,  Australasia (ANZ) was a combined team of athletes from Australia (AUS) and New Zealand (NZL). They competed together during the 1908 and 1912 Games.
  →  → ,  Prior to the foundation of Czechoslovakia (TCH) after World War I, athletes from Bohemia (BOH) (now part of the present-day Czech Republic) competed in 1900, 1908, and 1912 Games. Czechoslovakia competed in 1920–1992, from 1994 represented by successor NOCs of Czech Republic (CZE) and Slovakia (SVK).
The West Indies Federation only existed as a nation from 1958–1962, so the constituent nations once again competed independently in 1964.
Due to the partition of Germany after World War II, Germany was represented by two teams at the 1952 Games — Germany (GER) and the Saar (SAA). The Saar was reintegrated back into the Federal Republic of Germany on 1 January 1957, and Saar athletes then competed for Germany. East Germany did not contribute athletes to the 1952 team, as the National Olympic Committee for the German Democratic Republic was only granted "provisional" recognition by the IOC in 1955. For the Games of 1956–1964, Germany participated as a United Team of Germany (EUA), representing the National Olympic Committees of both West Germany and East Germany. Retrospectively, the IOC uses the country code EUA for this team. After the NOC for the German Democratic Republic was granted full recognition by the IOC in 1968, East Germany (GDR) and West Germany (FRG) competed as two independent teams from the 1968 to the 1988 Games.
 ,  →  Athletes from Malaya (MAL) and North Borneo (NBO) competed as independent teams at the 1956 Games and Malaya also competed at the 1960 Games, prior to the formation of the Federation of Malaysia (MAS) in 1963.
  The Netherlands Antilles (AHO), an autonomous country within the Netherlands (NED), competed 1952–2008. The Netherlands Antilles Olympic Committee's membership in the IOC was withdrawn in 2011 because of the dissolution of the Netherlands Antilles.
  →  →  →  Russian Empire (RU1) participated at the 1900, 1908 and 1912 Games prior to World War I. The Soviet Union (URS) competed from 1952 to 1988. Unified Team (EUN) is the generic name used for a combined team of six post-Soviet republics that competed at the 1992 Winter Olympics and a combined team of twelve post-Soviet republics that competed at the 1992 Summer Olympics. Russian Federation (RUS) and the other fourteen post-Soviet republics started competing independently in 1992 (Latvia, Lithuania, Estonia), 1994 or 1996.

Yugoslavia (YUG, 1920–1992 Winter) competed as Kingdom of Yugoslavia (officially the Kingdom of Serbs, Croats and Slovenes until 1929) in five Games (1920–1936) before the Second World War. They later competed as Socialist Federal Republic of Yugoslavia for the Games (1948–1992 Winter). This ended with the breakup of Yugoslavia. Some ex-Yugoslavian nations (Croatia, Slovenia, Bosnia and Herzegovina) have competed as independent teams since 1992. Individual athletes from the Federal Republic of Yugoslavia (Serbia and Montenegro) competed as Independent Olympic Participants (IOP) at the 1992 Summer Games because of sanctions placed by the United Nations. Athletes representing Macedonia likewise competed as Independent Olympic Participants that year because their NOC had not yet been formed, but since 1996 Macedonia has competed as an independent team. The team of the State Union of Serbia and Montenegro (SCG, 2004–2006) consisted of Serbia and Montenegro, until 2006 when Montenegro seceded from the Union. This team competed as Yugoslavia (YUG) from 1996–2002 and then changed to Serbia and Montenegro (2004–2006). After 96 years Serbia returned to the Olympics as an independent team at the 2008 Games. Montenegro first participated as an independent team in 2008.
 ,  →  Prior to Yemeni unification in 1990, North Yemen participated as the Yemen Arab Republic (YAR) in 1984 and 1988, and South Yemen participated as the Yemen Democratic Republic (YMD) at the 1988 Games. After forming united republic Yemen (YEM) has participated since 1992.
  → ,  The Republic of China was designated as China at the 1932, 1936, and 1948 Games and was representing all of China (including Taiwan). After the Chinese Civil War, the People's Republic of China (CHN) and Chinese Taipei (TPE) have participated as separate teams.
  Special code used by the IOC to refer to medals won by athletes of multiple nations competing together, which was common in early Games (1896–1904). These medals are not included in the respective totals for each nation represented by individual mixed team athletes.
At the 1992 Summer Olympics fifty eight athletes from former Yugoslavia competed as Independent Olympic Participants (IOP). At the 2000 Summer Olympics four athletes from East Timor competed as Individual Olympic Athletes (IOA). At the 2012 Summer Olympics three athletes from former Netherlands Antilles and one athlete from South Sudan competed as Independent Olympic Athletes (IOA). At the 2014 Winter Olympics three athletes from India competed as Independent Olympic Participants (IOP). At the 2016 Summer Olympics nine athletes from Kuwait competed as Independent Olympic Athletes (IOA). At the 2018 Winter Olympics 168 athletes from Russia competed as Olympics Athletes from Russia (OAR). Since the 2020 Summer Olympics athletes from Russia are competing as Russian Olympic Committee (ROC).

Name changes notes

  Belize participated under its former name of British Honduras (HBR) in 1968 and 1972.
  Benin was known as Dahomey (DAH) in 1972.
  Burkina Faso was known as Upper Volta (VOL) in 1972.
  After the Chinese Civil War, Chinese Taipei (TPE) participated using the name of the Republic of China at the 1956, 1960, 1972 and 1976 (winter) Games and using Taiwan designation at the 1964 and 1968 Games. In 1979, the IOC started to use Chinese Taipei to refer to the NOC, a compromise that was acceptable for the People's Republic of China (CHN) that led to the start of its participation in the Olympic Games. The name Chinese Taipei was first used in 1984. Participation of the Republic of China, representing all of China (including Taiwan), in 1932, 1936 and 1948 Games are not counted in Taiwan's total participation count.
  The Democratic Republic of the Congo was known as Zaire (ZAI) between 1984 and 1996.
  Côte d'Ivoire was known as Ivory Coast between 1964 and 1988.
  Egypt participated as the United Arab Republic (UAR) between 1960 and 1968.
  Includes medals won by athletes from the United Kingdom of Great Britain and Ireland (1896–1920) and the United Kingdom of Great Britain and Northern Ireland (1924–present), both of which used the name "Great Britain" and the country code GBR.

  Prior to Ghana's independence in 1957, Gold Coast participated in the 1952 Games.
  Prior to Guyana's independence in 1966, British Guiana participated from 1948 to 1964.
  Totals of Hong Kong (HKG) includes all medals won by athletes representing the Hong Kong National Olympic Committee, designated as "Hong Kong" from 1952–1996 and "Hong Kong, China" since 2000.
  North Macedonia was known as Macedonia, or more formally the Former Yugoslav Republic of Macedonia due to a naming dispute with Greece, between 1996 and 2018.
  Myanmar was known as Burma (BIR) between 1948 and 1988.
  Samoa was known as Western Samoa between 1984 and 1996.
  Sri Lanka was known as Ceylon (CEY) between 1948 and 1972.
  Eswatini was known as Swaziland between 1972 and 2016.
  Although Tanganyika and Zanzibar had already merged to form Tanzania in April 1964, the nation was designated Tanganyika in the official report of the 1964 Games.
  Zambia achieved independence on the last day of the 1964 Games, but had participated as Northern Rhodesia (NRH) during those Games.
  Prior to Zimbabwe's independence in 1980, Southern Rhodesia participated as Rhodesia (RHO) in 1928, 1960, and 1964 Games.

Participation notes

  Brunei's participation in the 1988 Games consisted only of a single official, but no competing athletes. This participation is not counted in Brunei's participation total.
  Djibouti at the 2004 Games took part in the Opening Ceremony, but neither athlete competed, so this participation is not counted in Djibouti's participation total.
  Liberia's athletes withdrew from 1980 Games after marching in the Opening Ceremony and took part in the boycott. This participation is not counted in Liberia's participation total.
  Libya marched in the opening ceremony of the 1964 Games, but then withdrew from competition. This participation is not counted in Libya's participation total.
  Suriname at the 1960 Games took part in the Opening Ceremony, but its lone athlete withdrew from Games due to a scheduling error. Participation of Suriname at the 1960 Games not recognized by IOC, so this participation is not counted in Suriname's participation total.

  India's athletes originally competed at the 2014 Games as Independent Olympic Participants and marched under the Olympic Flag during the opening ceremony due to the Indian Olympic Association's suspension. On February 11, 2014, the Indian Olympic Association was reinstated and India's athletes were allowed the option to compete under their own flag from that time onward.
  Does not include the participation of East Timor's and Netherlands Antilles's athletes as Individual Olympic Athletes (IOA) at the 2000 Summer Olympics and the 2012 Summer Olympics.
  Does not include medals won as part of mixed teams with athletes from other nations (1896–1904).

Disputed participation notes

  The Bulgarian Olympic Committee claims that Charles Champaud, a Swiss gymnastics teacher living in Sofia, competed for the nation in 1896. Bulgarian participation at the 1896 Games is recognized by the IOC.
  The Chilean Olympic Committee claims that Luis Subercaseaux Errázuriz, a Chilean diplomat and athlete, competed for the nation in 1896. Chilean participation at the 1896 Games is recognized by the IOC.
  Some sources consider Léon Thiércelin, a fencer who competed at the 1900 Games, of Haitian nationality and therefore the first Olympic appearance by Haiti. Participation of Haiti at the 1900 Games is not recognized by the IOC, so this participation is not counted in Haiti's participation total.
  Some sources consider Freydoun Malkom, a fencer who competed at the 1900 Games, of Persian nationality and therefore the first Olympic appearance by Iran. Participation of Iran at the 1900 Games is not recognized by the IOC, so this participation is not counted in Iran's participation total.
  Some sources consider Carlos de Candamo, a fencer who competed at the 1900 Games, of Peruvian nationality and therefore the first Olympic appearance by Peru. Participation of Peru at the 1900 Games is not recognized by the IOC, so this participation is not counted in Peru's participation total.
  Enrico Brusoni's gold medal in the Cycling Men's Points Race at the 1900 Summer Olympics is recognized by the Italian National Olympic Committee as well as the IOC as being won in a 1900 Summer Olympics event, although some sources state it was unofficial.
  Monaco earned a bronze in the art competitions at the 1924 Summer Olympics. However, medals in art competitions are no longer recognized by the IOC.
  Michel Théato, a French athlete who won the gold medal in marathon at the 1900 Games, was born in Luxembourg. The IOC does not recognize Luxembourg participation at the 1900 Games and attributes his medal to France.

The nationalities of many medalists at the 1904 Olympics are disputed as many competitors were recent immigrants to the United States who had not yet been granted US citizenship.
  Sources are inconsistent regarding Albert Corey's participation in 1904, who immigrated to the United States from France. The Games report refers to Corey as a "Frenchman wearing the colors of the Chicago Athletic Association", but the IOC attributes his medal in the marathon to the United States, and in contradiction, the medal in the four mile team race (that was won by a team of three Americans and Corey) to a mixed team composed of athletes from multiple nations instead of just the United States.
  The International Olympic Committee considers Norwegian-American wrestlers Charles Ericksen and Bernhoff Hansen who immigrated from Norway to the United States to have competed for the United States. Each man won a gold medal. In 2012, Norwegian historians however found documentation showing that Ericksen did not receive American citizenship until March 22, 1905, and that Hansen, who was registered as an "alien" (foreigner) as late as 1925, probably never received American citizenship. The historians have therefore petitioned the IOC to have the athletes registered as Norwegians. In May 2013 it was reported that the Norwegian Olympic Committee had filed a formal application for changing the nationality of the wrestlers in the IOC's medal database.
  Bob Fowler, an American marathon runner who competed at the 1904 Games, was a native Newfoundlander, Newfoundland is occasionally listed as a separate country at the 1904 Olympics, and would be listed as an historical NOC without medals. Participation of Newfoundland at the 1904 Games is not recognized by the IOC.
  In 2009, historians from the International Society of Olympic Historians discovered that cyclist Frank Bizzoni was an Italian citizen when he competed in 1904 being granted US citizenship in 1917. However, the IOC does not officially recognize Italy's participation in the 1904 Olympics.
  The IOC counts one gold, one silver, and two bronze medals won by American fencer Albertson Van Zo Post for Cuba instead of the United States. The one silver and one bronze medal won by American Charles Tatham are also counted for Cuba instead of the United States.

See also

 All-time Paralympic Games medal table
 All-time Youth Olympic Games medal table
 Olympic medal table
 List of first Olympic gold medalists by country
 List of participating nations at the Summer Olympic Games
 List of participating nations at the Winter Olympic Games
 List of multiple Olympic gold medalists
 List of multiple Olympic gold medalists at a single Games
 List of multiple Olympic gold medalists in one event
 List of multiple Olympic medalists
 List of multiple Olympic medalists at a single Games
 List of multiple Olympic medalists in one event
 List of Olympic teams by medals won

References

External links
All-time medal counts are compiled by various sources, often adding up related results for Russia, Germany, Serbia, Czech Republic, etc.
 OlympiaStatistik.de (2006)
 NBC  
 
 Historical Medals - london2012.com (Summer Games, not corrected for disqualifications after 13 August 2012)
 All-time Olympic Medals - series of interactive maps
 Olympanalyt.com - medals by countries

Sources
 International Olympic Committee medal database
 Official Olympic Reports

Medal tables at multi-sport events
Olympic Games medal tables
Olympic medals
Olympics-related lists